The Schizothyriaceae are a family of fungi of uncertain ordinal placement in the class Dothideomycetes. It comprises 10 genera and around 70 species.

Genera
Amazonotheca  – 2 spp.
Hexagonella  – 1 sp.
Kerniomyces  – 1 sp.
Lecideopsella  – 10 spp.
Metathyriella  – 3 spp.
Mycerema  – 1 sp.
Myriangiella  – 5 spp.
Plochmopeltis  – 5 spp.
Schizothyrium  – 40 spp.
Spegazziniella  – 14 spp.
Sydowiellina  - 15 spp.
Vonarxella  – 1 sp.

References

Dothideomycetes
Ascomycota families
Taxa described in 1928